The World Transplant Games (WTG) are an international multi-sport event, occurring every two years, organized by the World Transplant Games Federation (WTGF). The Games promote amateur sport amongst organ transplant recipients, living donors and donor families.

Summer Games

Winter Games

Sports 

Summer:
  Athletics
  Athletics (road race)
  Swimming
  Cycling
  Kayak
  Badminton
  Table tennis
  Paddle tennis
  Tennis
  Squash
  Triathlon
  Bowling
  Darts
  Golf
  Lawn bowls
  Pétanque
  Tejo
  3x3 basketball
  Volleyball

Winter:
  Biathlon
  Curling
  Snowboarding
  Skiing
 Slalom
 Giant Slalom
 Super Giant Slalom
 Parallel Slalom
 Nicholas Cup : Slalom Race for Children (A Ski Event for Transplanted Children)

SPORTS – DONORS
(including deceased donor families and living donors)
• Road Race
• 50m Freestyle
• Athletics:
100m sprint, ball throw, long jump

worldtransplantgames.org/sports/

worldtransplantgames.org/sports-rules/

Age Groups 
Seniors age groups:
(18-29), (30-39), (40-49), (50-59), (60-69), (70-79) and (80+). Doubles events: (18-29), (30-49) and (50+). 
Juniors age groups:
(5 years and under), (6-8), (9-11), (12-14) and (15-17). Juniors 16 or 17 years of age are permitted to compete in adult age events, but must then compete only in adult events.

http://wtgf.org/sports-youth/

worldtransplantgames.org/games/

2020
wtgf.org/results/

wtgf.org/wp-content/uploads/2020/03/WTWG-Medals-03-10-2020.pdf

1-CAN

2-FRA

3-USA

4-SUI

5-GBR

6-GER

7-HUN

8-ITA

9-AUT

10-NOR

11-AUS

12-POL

13-CZE

14-FIN

15-SWE

References

External links
Official website
Results and Medal Table

Multi-sport events
World